Gorakhgad Fort is a fort located 24 km from Murbad, Thane district, of Maharashtra. This fort is an important fort in Thane district. This fort was mainly used by sadhus or hermits for meditation.and also by local people's of surrounding village, It was also used to guard the ancient trade route passing through Naneghat.

Location
The nearest town is Dehri Talekhal village which is 24 km from murbad.

Description
After main entrance gate there is an inscription in Marathi. There are rock cut water cisterns near the cave. The water is available round the year for drinking purpose. The cave is spacious and has square pillars. There is a small Mahadev temple on the top. The Ahupe Ghat and Siddhagad can be seen from the top.

Gallery

See also 
 List of forts in Maharashtra
 List of forts in India
 Marathi People
 Maratha Navy
 List of Maratha dynasties and states
 Maratha War of Independence
 Battles involving the Maratha Empire
 Maratha Army
 Maratha titles
 Military history of India
 List of people involved in the Maratha Empire

References

Buildings and structures of the Maratha Empire
16th-century forts in India
Buildings and structures in Maharashtra
Caves of Maharashtra
Tourist attractions in Thane district